Miss World 1980, the 30th anniversary of the Miss World pageant, was held on 13 November 1980 at the Royal Albert Hall in London, United Kingdom, televised for the first time by Thames Television for ITV. The winner was Gabriella Brum from Germany. She was crowned by Miss World 1979, Gina Swainson of Bermuda. First runner-up was Kimberley Santos representing Guam, second was Patricia Barzyk from France, third was Anat Zimmermann of Israel, and fourth was Kim Ashfield from the United Kingdom.

Brum resigned after 18 hours of holding the title, and 14 days later, first runner-up Santos was crowned the new Miss World by 1977 winner Mary Stävin in Guam.

Results

Placements

Contestants

Judges

 Eric Morley † 
 Peter Thompson
 Alan Minter † 
 Viviane Ventura
 Bruce Forsyth † 
 Dennis Waterman † 
 Sophia Mamba
 Wilnelia Merced – Miss World 1975 from Puerto Rico
 John McMenamin

Notes

Debuts

Returns

Last competed in 1977:
 
Last competed in 1978:

Withdrawals

References

Further reading

External links
 Pageantopolis – Miss World 1980

Miss World
1980 in London
1980 beauty pageants
Beauty pageants in the United Kingdom
Events at the Royal Albert Hall
November 1980 events in the United States